Western Australia GAA (WAGAA) was established in 1975. It is the ruling body for Gaelic football and hurling in the Western Australia region of Australia. The AGAA is affiliated to the Australasia GAA.

The WAGAA runs both Men's and Women's Football matches over the summer at Gaelic Park in Australia. The competition was previously played over winter, however clashes with other sports deemed it necessary to move to a summer competition to attract more players.

State Representative Teams are sent to the Australasian Championships every year with Men's senior and Minors and Women's Teams competing.

Clubs
Bunbury GFC
Greenwood GFC
Morley Gaels GFC - Website
Southern Districts
St Finbarr's Gaelic Football Club - Website
Western Shamrocks

See also

References

External links
 

Sports governing bodies in Western Australia
Australasia GAA
Gaelic games governing bodies in Australia
Irish-Australian culture
Sports organizations established in 1975
1975 establishments in Australia